Deh-e Shur (also Romanized as Deh-e Shūr; also known as Deh-e Shūrāb and Deh Shūrāb) is a village in Montazeriyeh Rural District, in the Central District of Tabas County, South Khorasan Province, Iran. At the 2006 census, its population was 220, in 61 families.

References 

Populated places in Tabas County